Germany–Kosovo relations are foreign relations between the Federal Republic of Germany and the Republic of Kosovo. Kosovo declared its independence from Serbia on 17 February 2008 and Germany recognized it on 20 February 2008. Germany has an embassy in Pristina since 27 February 2008. Kosovo has an embassy in Berlin and consulates in Frankfurt, Stuttgart., and in Munich. The two countries have very good and friendly relations.

Germany is the second-largest donor to Kosovo behind the US.

BND affair 
On 19 November 2008 three agents of the Bundesnachrichtendienst were arrested in Kosovo and accused of involvement in a bomb attack five days earlier. The German media speculated that this arrest was meant as some kind of punishment for the BND, which in 2005 certified that Prime Minister Hashim Thaçi was involved in the Kosovar-Albanian mafia network. Even though the Kosovo police claimed to have video evidence proving the involvement of the three agents (which was never shown to the public), they were released on November 28, 2008. An unknown group called Army of the Republic of Kosovo (ARK) claimed responsibility for the bomb attack.

Military

Germany participated in the 1999 NATO bombing of Yugoslavia, which resulted in a UN administration of Kosovo and then to eventual independence. Germany currently has 2,350 troops serving in Kosovo as peacekeepers in the NATO led Kosovo Force. Originally there were 8,500 German troops in KFOR. Klaus Reinhardt was the 2nd KFOR Commander from 8 October 1999 until 18 April 2000. Holger Kammerhoff was the 8th KFOR Commander from 3 October 2003 until 1 September 2004. Roland Kather was the 11th KFOR Commander from 1 September 2006 until 31 August 2007.

Germany sent 600 Soldiers to serve as Peacekeepers in EULEX; an EU Police, Civilian and Law Mission in Kosovo.

See also 
 Foreign relations of Germany
 Foreign relations of Kosovo
 Germany–Serbia relations
 Germany–Yugoslavia relations
 East Germany–Yugoslavia relations

Notes

References

 
Bilateral relations of Kosovo
Kosovo